Viktor Legát (born 1905, date of death unknown) was a Czech swimmer. He competed in three events at the 1924 Summer Olympics.

References

External links
 

1905 births
Year of death missing
Czech male swimmers
Olympic swimmers of Czechoslovakia
Swimmers at the 1924 Summer Olympics
Place of birth missing